Alisa Kajornchaiyakul (born October 18, 1966) was Thailand's representatives at Miss World 1982 in the United Kingdom.

References

1966 births
Living people
Miss World 1982 delegates
Alisa Kajornchaiyakul
Alisa Kajornchaiyakul
Alisa Kajornchaiyakul